Fugitive in Saigon (French: Mort en fraude) is a 1957 French war drama film directed by Marcel Camus and starring Daniel Gélin, Anne Méchard and Lucien Callamand. It was shot on location in Cambodia. The film's sets were designed by the art director Paul-Louis Boutié. It was one of the first films to deal with France's defeat in the First Indochina War, along with Shock Patrol by Claude Bernard-Aubert.

Synopsis
In 1950 Saigon Paul Horcier, a young Frenchman is on the run for currency trafficking. A Eurasian woman he meets takes him to shelter in a village in No man's land between the French forces and the Viet Minh. He grows to have enormous empathy with the locals and their poor living conditions. He ultimately lays down his life on their behalf.

Cast
 Daniel Gélin as Paul Horcier
 Anne Méchard as 	Anh
 Lucien Callamand as 	Le chef de la police
 Jacques Chancel as 	The Vice President
 Dang Van Than as Grandfather
 Antoine Filidori as The Smuggler
 Be Thi Nam as The Mother
 Nguyen Phuong as The sister of the Village Headman
 Luong Van Vuong as The Man with Harmonica
 Tring Trac as 	The Village Headman
 Dang Van Nhan as 	Ty - brother of Anh

References

Bibliography
 Williams, Alan. Republic of Images: A History of French Filmmaking. Harvard University Press, 1992.

External links 
 

1957 films
French war films
1950s French-language films
1957 war films
Films directed by Marcel Camus
Films based on French novels
Films set in 1950
Films set in Saigon
Films shot in Cambodia
Films with screenplays by Michel Audiard
1950s French films